Buttons may refer to one of several genera of plants in the family Asteraceae:

 Cotula
 Craspedia
 Leiocarpa
 Leptorhynchos (plant)
 Pycnosorus

See also
Billy buttons